Columbus, the state capital and Ohio's largest city, has numerous neighborhoods within its city limits. Neighborhood names and boundaries are not officially defined. They may vary or change from time to time due to demographic and economic variables.

Areas of concentration

Columbus's African American population is largely concentrated in neighborhoods northeast and southeast of Downtown Columbus, as well as areas immediately west and east of Downtown, such as Franklinton and the Near East. Native-born whites and assimilated ethnic Europeans are dispersed throughout the city, with higher concentrations in neighborhoods in the western half of Columbus, and areas immediately south and north of Downtown. Columbus has a growing immigrant population of Hispanics, Asians and Asian Americans, and Africans. In the far west side of Columbus, especially in the Hilltop, there is a notable and diverse Hispanic population, with people of Mexican descent being the largest of Hispanic groups. There is also a much smaller Hispanic population, mostly made up of Puerto Ricans, in Northeast neighborhoods such as Northland and North Linden, where there is also a significant Somali population. In the northeast part of the city,near the 161 and Tamarack area.In areas close to Ohio State University, there are significant populations with origins from India and China.

Downtown Columbus

Downtown Columbus is the Central Business District of Columbus, Ohio. The area centers on the intersection of Broad and High streets, with the northeast corners being known simple as Broad & High by the surrounding businesses and media. Downtown as a whole encompasses all the area inside the inner belt and is home to most of the largest buildings in Columbus. 
The Ohio Statehouse is located on the southeast corner of Broad & High, on Capitol Square. Downtown is also home to Columbus State Community College, Franklin University, Columbus College of Art and Design, Grant Medical Center, Capital University Law School, as well as the main branch of the Columbus Metropolitan Library, the Main Street Bridge and many parks. Downtown has many neighborhoods or "districts," but it can easily be separated into three main areas: The Discovery District, High Street Corridor, and the Riverfront. The Short North, Italian Village, and Victorian Village are directly north of Downtown. Olde Towne East, and the historic King-Lincoln District are directly east, while the Brewery District and German Village are directly south of Downtown. Franklinton is to the west of Downtown, with a portion of Franklinton in Downtown. The northwest area includes the Arena District, a mixed-use development centered on Nationwide Arena, the home of the Columbus Blue Jackets. The Arena District also includes the baseball stadium Huntington Park and the Lifestyle Communities Pavilion.

As of 2013, over 87,000 people are employed Downtown and more than 25,000 students attend school at one of the many institutions of higher education located there. Downtown is currently home to over 6,300 residents.

Arena District

The Arena District is a mixed-use planned development and neighborhood in Columbus, Ohio. The site was developed through a partnership between Nationwide Realty Investors, Ltd. (a subsidiary of Nationwide), the City of Columbus, and private investors. Interpretation of the boundaries of the district are evolving as the neighboring blocks around the original  site has seen additional commercial and residential development. Currently, the Arena District contains Nationwide Arena, for which the district is named.

Discovery District
The Discovery District is located in the eastern part of Downtown Columbus. It is bordered by the Interstate 670 Innerbelt to the north, Interstate 71 to the east, Fulton Street to the south, and Fifth Street to the west. Within the vibrant and distinctive urban enclave are many not-for-profit and cultural institutions, including the Columbus Metropolitan Library, which has been ranked as one of the country's top urban libraries, and the Columbus Museum of Art. Other regional destinations include the French Topiary Gardens at the Old Deaf School Park, as well as educational institutions such as the Columbus College of Art and Design, Franklin University, Capital University Law School and Columbus State Community College.

Park Street District

Park Street District is a subneighborhood of the Arena District in Columbus, Ohio. The District gets its name from the heavily trafficked Park Street thoroughfare that runs through its core. Devoid of any large residential land, the district comprises mainly restaurants and bars. The site was developed through multiple companies. The district is often considered to be part of the Short North due to its overlapping boundaries and mutual attractions such as the North Market.

River South District
This area is located along the Scioto River in southwest Downtown Columbus. It is bounded by Town Street to the north, Wall Street to the east, Mound Street to the south, and the Scioto River to the west.

Uptown District
The Uptown District is a neighborhood in Downtown Columbus. It is bounded by Nationwide Boulevard to the North, South Fourth Street to the east, East Town Street to the south, and South Front Street to the west.

The Short North

 

The Short North is a neighborhood in Columbus, Ohio centered on the main strip of High Street immediately north of downtown and extending until just south of the Ohio State University campus area. It is an easy walk from the convention center or Nationwide Arena district to the north. The Short North is often crowded on weekends, particularly during the monthly "Gallery Hop" and other local and downtown events.

The Short North is heavily populated with art galleries, specialty shops, pubs, nightclubs, and coffee houses. Most of its tightly packed brick buildings date from at least the early 20th century, with traditional storefronts along High Street (often with brightly painted murals on their side walls), and old apartment buildings and rowhouses and newer condominium developments in the surrounding blocks. The city installed 17 lighted metal archways extending across High Street throughout the Short North, reminiscent of such arches present in the area in the early 1900s.

The area is also known to be a very gay and lesbian friendly neighborhood and many gay nightclubs and bars are located the area and is the location of the annual Columbus gay pride parade.

Italian Village

Italian Village is a mixed land use neighborhood in Columbus, Ohio that contains an array of residential, commercial, and industrial buildings. It is a designated historic district, known for its historical and cultural preservation. The building types and architecture reflect Italian influence. With its parks and preserved historic homes, Italian Village has the highest home value appreciation in Columbus.
Italian Village is part of the Short North area. The neighboring Downtown District provides access to major employers, cultural and learning institutions, and entertainment venues.

Victorian Village

Victorian Village is a neighborhood located north and near west of Downtown. It is an older area with a fair number of established trees for an urban setting. Neil Avenue, a street running north–south and eventually crossing through the campus of The Ohio State University, is its main thoroughfare.

South Side and South East

Brewery District

The Brewery District is a neighborhood located in Columbus, Ohio. Located just south of the central business district, the area has a history stretching nearly 200 years. It is bounded by Interstate 70 on the north, South Pearl Street on the east, Greenlawn Avenue on the south, and the Scioto River on the west. The first brewery was opened by German immigrant Louis Hoster in 1836. At the height of its success, there were five breweries located in the area. As the years passed, consolidation of the breweries took place. However, the market went south when, in 1920, Prohibition took effect due to the passage of the 18th Amendment. The area declined, becoming home to some industry and warehouses. In recent years, redevelopment has taken place on a large scale, with numerous restaurants, bars, and even a grocery store coming to the area. The radio station CD 101, now CD102.5, also calls the district home. 
The Germania Club, a German-American Singing and Sports Society, has been in the area since 1866 and in 1927 purchased the former home of one of the prestigious brew masters of the neighborhood, Nicolaus Schlee for use by the club.

German Village

German Village is a historic neighborhood just south of downtown. It was settled by a large number of German immigrants in the mid-19th century, who at one time constituted as much as a third of the population of the entire city. It has a commercial strip mainly centered along South Third Street, with mostly locally owned restaurants, as well as the tall-steepled St. Mary Catholic Church. The area is mostly a residential neighborhood of sturdy, red-brick homes with wrought iron fences along tree-lined, brick-paved streets. At the southern end, Schiller Park, named after Friedrich von Schiller, was once a community meeting ground for the German settlement. It is now the site of recreational facilities, gardens and an amphitheater, which hosts free live performances of Shakespearean plays during the summer months courtesy of the Actor's Theatre.

Livingston Avenue Area Commission

Driving Park

Driving Park is an urban residential area on the Near East Side. Just south of Interstate 70, it neighbors many notable areas including Livingston Park, Old Oaks Historic District, and the Bryden Road Historic District, all with the common thread of the notable Livingston Avenue Corridor which was part of one of Columbus' first streetcar suburbs. When the neighborhood is referenced, its boundaries generally consist of Mooberry Street on the north, Alum Creek Drive on the east, East Whittier Street on the south, and Miller Avenue to the west. The Driving Park Area Commission recognizes the neighborhood's borders as I-70 on the north, N&W Railway on the east, East Whittier Street on the south, and Lockbourne Avenue on the west. Further reference places the community directly in between Bexley and German Village.

Old Oaks

Old Oaks is a historic district that is located just east of Downtown Columbus. The neighborhood is bounded on the north by Mooberry Street, on the east by the homes on Kimball Place, on the south by East Livingston Avenue, and on the west by the homes on South Ohio Avenue.

It neighbors many notable areas including Livingston Park, Bryden Road Historic District and Driving Park, all with the common thread of the notable Livingston Avenue Corridor which was part of one of Columbus' first streetcar suburbs.

Architecture styles include American Foursquare in Mission and Neoclassical Revival styles, as well as Modified Queen Anne's.

Livingston Park

Livingston Park is a neighborhood that shares its name with the oldest owned parkland in the City of Columbus. It is bounded by 3rd. St. (West), Livingston Ave. (South), Mooberry Street (North), and Ohio Ave (East). The residential area largely consists of Carpenter, Gilbert, S. 22nd, and Ohio Streets between Mooberry St. and Livingston Ave. The commercial areas, West of 18th, include the site of Nationwide Children's Hospital.

South Side Area Commission

Deshler Park
Bounded by East Whittier Street to the north, Fairwood Avenue or Alum Creek Drive the east, Moler Road or Frebis Avenue to the south, and Lockbourne Road to the west.

Edgewood Acres
Edgewood Acres is bordered by Thurman Avenue to the north, Lockbourne Road to the east, Frebis Avenue to the south, and South Champion Avenue to the west. It is just east of Lincoln Park.

Hungarian Village

Hungarian Village is a neighborhood south of downtown Columbus between Merion Village and Reeb-Hosack/Steelton Village, encompassing the area between Woodrow and Hinman Avenues between South High Street and Parsons Avenue. At the turn of the 20th century, the area became home to Hungarian, Croatian, and Italian immigrants, and later, refugees fleeing the failed Hungarian Revolution of 1956.

Innis Gardens
This area is bordered by Moler Road to the north, Fairwood Avenue to the east, Innis Avenue to the south, and Lockbourne Road to the west. It is just east of Edgewood.

Lincoln Park/Vassor Village
This area is bordered by Frebis Avenue to the north, South Champion Avenue to the east, Woodrow Avenue to the south, and Parsons Avenue to the west.

Merion Village

Just south of German Village, Merion Village is a neighborhood with homes mostly from around the turn of the 20th century. Renovators are fixing up many of the vacant homes. Two new police patrols were added in 2020 to help in crime watcher and Shot Tracer technology is now in use on the south side.

Notable landmarks include:
 Saint Leo Oratory
 Southwood Elementary School
 Charles S. Barrett Building

Millbrook
This area is bordered by Moler Road to the north, Universal Road to the south, Progress Road to the east, and Fairwood Avenue to the west. It is just east of Innis Gardens.

Reeb-Hosack

This is the area between Reeb Avenue and Hosack Street on the south side of the city. It is bordered on the west and east ends by South High Street and Parsons Avenue.

Schumacher Place

This is a small area located east of German Village and is often mistaken as part of it. It is bordered on the north by East Livingston Avenue, the east by Parsons Avenue, the south by East Whittier Street, and the west by Lathrop Street, Brust Street, South Grant Avenue, and Jaeger Street.

Steelton Village

Swaynes Addition/Southern Orchards
Southern Orchards is an established neighborhood on the near south side of Columbus, Ohio, located immediately outside of downtown. It's the 23rd most walkable neighborhood in Columbus and has 3,538 residents. The neighborhood is the target of revitalization and beautification largely due to its anchor institution Nationwide Children's Hospital. and a renewed interest in urban living in the city's core. Since 2008, more than 70 properties have been improved through the hospital's Healthy Homes program and continued revitalization is happening along the major streets of Livingston and Parsons as the city moves to reconnect the downtown to its surrounding neighborhoods.

Thurman Square
This area is south of Southern Orchards and north of Vassor Village and bordered by Whittier Street to the north, Lockbourne to the east, Frebis Avenue to the south, and Parsons Avenue to the west. Civic and block watches within the neighborhood include Thurman Square, Ganthers Place, South Central Commons, and Edgewood.

East Side

The East Side is an area made up several historic neighborhoods on the east side of Columbus, Ohio. Some neighborhoods making up the area include: Beatty Park, King-Lincoln Bronzeville, Eastgate, Franklin Park, Mt. Vernon Avenue District, Nelson Park, Olde Towne East, and Woodland Park. Today it is bordered by the Norfolk Southern railway on the north, Alum Creek on the east, Interstate 70 and Livingston Avenue on the south, and Interstate 71 on the west. It is bisected by Main Street, also known as the National Road. This area is in Precincts 6, 12, and 5 of the Columbus Division of Police

East Broad Street Historic District

The East Broad Street Historic District is a historic district that was listed on the National Register of Historic Places in 1987. It includes the section of East Broad Street from Ohio Avenue on the west to Monypenny Street on the east.

Eastgate and Nelson Park
Developed in 1916, the Eastgate neighborhood includes Nelson Park, Eastgate Elementary School, and the intersection of East Broad Street and Nelson Road. It is commonly referred to as both Eastgate and Nelson Park

Franklin Park

This neighborhood is bounded by East Broad Street to the north, Alum Creek to the east, East Main Street to the south, and Wilson Avenue to the west. It is surrounded by the neighborhoods of Woodland Park, South of Main, and Olde Towne East, and the city of Bexley. The neighborhood is named after the 88 acre park. Both the neighborhood and landmark park contain the Franklin Park Conservatory and Botanical Gardens, also named after the park.

King-Lincoln Bronzeville

Just east of Downtown Columbus, this area is bordered by the Mount Vernon neighborhood and Atcheson Street on the north, North 20th Street on the east, Olde Towne East and East Broad Street on the south, and I-71 on the west. The area was at one time much larger, including parts of what is now the Discovery District. The creation of I-71 significantly cut the area off from Downtown, causing socioeconomic decline and the growth of crime and violence. The neighborhood has become the focus of the city's revitalization efforts which include renovation of the historic Lincoln Theatre, construction of new condos and expansion of retail space along Mt. Vernon Avenue and East Long Street, which hosts the annual Long Street Tour cycling event.

Mount Vernon or Beatty Park

Mount Vernon lies within the historic Near East Side community. It borders interstates 71 and 670. Its main thoroughfares, Mount Vernon Avenue, East Long Street, Atcheson Street, and Champion Avenue define the community's limits.

Olde Towne East

Olde Towne East is a neighborhood located in the historic Near East Side. Today known as "Olde Towne East," the neighborhood was settled early in Columbus' history and is situated between the Downtown Market and Discovery Districts, Franklin Park, King-Lincoln Bronzeville, Livingston Park North, and Old Oaks. The area has over 1,000 homes, some as old as the 1830s, and more than 50 architectural styles including Italianate, Queen Anne and Victorian.

South of Main
South of Main is a neighborhood located in the Near East Side. It is bounded by Main Street to the north, Alum Creek to the east, I-70 to the south, and Wilson Avenue to the west.

Woodland Park

Woodland Park is a neighborhood in Columbus, Ohio bordered by Maryland Avenue to the north, Nelson Road to the east, East Broad Street to the south, and Taylor Avenue to the west.

The earliest houses in the subdivision were built around 1900 with most filling in the area between then and 1920. A large advertisement with a hand-drawn map appeared in the Sunday, June 26, 1904, Columbus Dispatch newspaper touting the benefits of the Woodland Park Addition. It says, "We give you paved streets, cement sidewalks, water, gas, sewerage, electric lights, plenty of fine forest trees and one of the best school districts in the city. Woodland Park Addition has the advantage of three electric car lines by which you can reach High Street in fifteen minutes."

Residents have formed the Woodland Park Neighborhood Association. Their website says, "Woodland Park was established at the turn of the twentieth century as one of the Columbus’ first planned, upscale suburban neighborhoods. Woodland Park was referred to as the 'North Gateway to Franklin Park' and rapidly became home to many of the founding families of Columbus as well as entrepreneurs, business owners, industrialists, educators and artists. Numerous prominent citizens of Columbus, including nationally renowned artist Emerson Burkhart have called Woodland Park home.

The neighborhood is home to an eclectic mixture of exquisite architecture including Colonial, Federal, Arts and Crafts, Victorian, Tudor, Mission, Dutch Colonial, Colonial Revival, Greek Revival, Georgian Colonial, French Eclectic, American Foursquare and Cape Cod. The neighborhood is composed of homes, townhomes and apartments ranging in size from massive mansions to bungalows and from penthouses to studio apartments. This diverse mixture of homes makes Woodland Park a comfortable, affordable and attractive neighborhood to live in."

Wolfe Park
Wolfe Park is a neighborhood surrounded by the city of Bexley on its north, east, and south sides, and by Alum Creek and Franklin Park to its west. The area was once known as the Marion Heights Addition, platted in 1909.

Clintonville

Clintonville is a neighborhood in north-central Columbus, Ohio with around 30,000 residents as of 2011. Clintonville is an informal neighborhood. The southern border is loosely defined as Arcadia Avenue or the Glen Echo Ravine. To the east, either Interstate 71 or the adjacent railroad tracks are commonly accepted. The western boundary is assumed to be the Olentangy River. The northern border of Clintonville is the most ambiguous, with definitions anywhere in the  stretch from Cooke Road to the southern border of Worthington. The Clintonville Area Commission boundaries, as established by Columbus City Code, are "bounded on the south by the centerline of the Glen Echo Ravine; on the east by the centerline of the railroad right-of-way immediately east of Indianola Avenue; on the north by the Worthington city limits and on the west by the Olentangy River; each line extended as necessary so as to intersect with adjacent boundaries".

As the cachet of the Clintonville neighborhood grew towards the turn of the 21st century, real estate agents began to label homes north of Cooke Road as being in Clintonville, leading to the apparent absorption of Beechwold and nearby neighborhoods south of Worthington. It was not uncommon in the booming real estate market circa 2000 to even find homes outside of the distinct east and west borders being sold as "Clintonville" homes. Because Clintonville and Beechwold have no official existence, however, the boundaries are a matter of opinion. The area also contains the former unincorporated community of Evanston, a name that was used by the Big Four Railroad as a station along its line and U.S. Postal service until the 1920s. Clintonville includes parts of ZIP codes 43202 and 43214. The United States Post Offices at the center of each ZIP code are known as Clintonville Station and Beechwold Station, respectively.

Despite unclear boundaries of neighborhoods the boundaries are generalized into four distinct neighborhoods: South Clintonville, North Clintonville, Beechwold, and North-of-Morse.

South Clintonville
South of North Broadway Street, housing stock is a mix of single and multiple family homes. The majority of these houses were built prior to 1930, and represent a variety of styles from basic American foursquare to other types of revival style architecture. The area is also home to many catalog (Sears, Montgomery Ward, Radford, etc.) kit homes. These neighborhoods were also initially developed as "streetcar" developments, the intention being that most residents would rely upon the High Street streetcar lines to travel to downtown Columbus. Garages for the earliest developed streets are accessed via alleys behind the properties.

North Clintonville
North Clintonville is a generalized area inside of the Clintonville neighborhood. Its boundaries are based either on the old City of Columbus Boundaries, or more modernly North Broadway. Per the old City of Columbus boundary: Overbrook Ravine to the north, Big Four railroad tracks to the east, Orchard Lane and roughly Oakland Park Avenue to the south, and the Olentangy River to the west. Per the modern interpretation: Overbrook Ravine to the north, North Broadway Street to the south, and the Olentangy River to the west. While often referred to as North Clintonville, it is the central section of Clintonville area. It is noted for the progression in architectural styles and lifestyle considerations from the 1920s through the late 1950s. Houses in this portion of Clintonville were built as higher end properties, lack alleyways and contain driveways as a nod to the increasing importance to the role of the automobile. Developments and subdivisions located in this area are: Indian Springs, Northridge, Dominion Park, Northmoor, Brevoort Place, North Broadway Street and Woodland Crest.

Beechwold
Beechwold is a neighborhood within the Clintonville Area Commission boundaries. Named for the Jeffrey family summer estate on North High Street and the post office placed in the area following growth of Clintonville, the larger Beechwold Area has greatly varying definitions, but at a minimum it is the collection of at least four subdivision plats. These four plats are: Beechwold (1915), Beechwold Addition (1919), Beechwold South (1902) and Beechwold South Amendment (1922). The section of commonly known as East Beechwold contains the subdivisions of Zooland and Highland Gardens. Through inclusion of East Beechwold, the larger Beechwold area is then loosely defined as the area Rathbone Avenue to the north, I-71 to the east, West Weisheimer Road to the south, and the Olentangy River to the west.

Northwold
Northwold is a ghost neighborhood, between Graceland Center and the Homedale Addition subdivision. The main street going across Northwold was Fenway Road, with the neighborhood being abandoned in 1933.

Old Beechwold
Old Beechwold was placed on National Register of Historic Places in 1987 and lies on the original Jeffrey family summer estate on North High Street. Its boundaries are, according to the entry on the National Register, roughly bounded by West Jeffrey Place to the north, North High Street to the east, River Park Drive to the south, and Olentangy Boulevard to the west. This description fits with the historic maps to include Beechwold (1915) and Beechwold Addition (1919) subdivisions.

East Beechwold
East Beechwold comprises the Zooland (1905) and Highland Gardens (1913, 1915) subdivisions, and as such is bounded by Morse Road to the north, I-71 to the east, Weisheimer Road to the south, and North High Street to the west.

South Beechwold
South Beechwold comprises the Beechwold South (1902/1922) and Weisheimer Addition No. 2 subdivisions. As such, it is bounded by property lines north of Beaumont Avenue to the north, North High Street to the east, Weisheimer Road to the south, and the Olentangy River to the west. It is almost exclusively residential, with exceptions to businesses located along High Street.

North-of-Morse
North-of-Morse is the northernmost section of Clintonville. It borders Worthington city limits at Cemetery and Chase roads to the north, I-71 to the east, Morse Road to the south, and the Olentangy River to the west. It contains the Graceland Shopping Center, as well as other residential homes.

Southwest

Briggsdale
Briggsdale is a neighborhood on the west/southwest side. It runs all along Briggs Road and can be defined as the entire area bounded by Briggs Road, Eakin Road east and west and Harrisburd Pike and Demorest Rd north and south. It is the area of south Hilltop and the northern-southwest side.

West Side
The West Side includes:

Franklinton

Franklinton is a neighborhood bordered by the Scioto River on the north and east, Harmon Avenue on the east, Stimmel Road and Greenlawn Avenue on the south, and Interstate 70 on the west. West Broad Street, or U.S. Route 40, is one of the country's first roads and is Franklinton's main throughway. It is the neighborhood immediately west of Downtown. A portion of the neighborhood has had a colorful nickname of "The Bottoms" because much of the land lies below the level of the Scioto and Olentangy rivers, and a floodwall is required to contain the rivers and protect the area from devastating floods. Just to the west of Franklinton is a group of smaller neighborhoods commonly referred to as "Hilltop."

Areas of Franklinton include South Franklinton and East Franklinton.

Hilltop and Greater Hilltop

The Hilltop is a geographic area on the west side of the city. It was so named because it sits atop a rise that slopes down into the Scioto River. Highland West, Wilshire Heights and Westgate are included within the Greater Hilltop area. It borders on Franklinton. The "Greater Hilltop Area" (as defined by the city of Columbus) is bounded by Interstate 70 on the north, B&O Railroad to the east and south, and the Interstate 270 outerbelt on the south and west. Its main thoroughfares are West Broad Street (U.S. Route 40) – upon which two welcome signs for the neighborhood sit (one near I-70 and one near Wilson Road) – Mound Street and Hague Avenue.

The Greater Hilltop area contains newer and historic neighborhoods, schools, various stores, industrial areas, and recreational facilities. The development pattern is considered a distinct suburb. The majority of the area is predominantly single family residential.

Greater Hilltop
Brookshire
Brookshire is community that runs along Briggs Road to Binns Boulevard back east on Eakin Road to Eureka Avenue. Brookshire was a baseball Little League power house for 16 years from 1969 to 1985 with 13 championships. Power Lifting was born on the West Side and Baseball was king.

Holly Hill

Holly Hill is a neighborhood located in West Columbus, Columbus, Ohio. Holly Hill is a traditional 1960s suburban neighborhood consisting of mostly brick ranch houses and some bi-level houses. Holly Hill is located next to Georgian Heights.

Highland West
Highland West, named for the end-of-the-line street car that served this area during the late 1800s, is the original settlement, or historic, older section, of the Hilltop area of West Columbus, which began to be settled in the early to mid-1800s. The primary early settlers of this area of the hilltop were those of English, Welsh, and African American descent. Highland West is bordered on the north by the railroad tracks (just south of the Columbus/Valleyview corporate line), on the east by I-70 and Franklinton (The Bottoms), on the south by Sullivant Avenue, and on the west by Hague Avenue. Highland West is a collection of the original neighborhoods that lined the National Road, Glenwood Heights, Maple Grove, Buckingham Heights, Westwood Heights, Oakley, Arlington, Highland Park, Bellaire, Bronx, Eldon Heights, Glenview Heights, Hillcrest Park, High Park, Landscape Addition, Florence Park, and Wicklow.

Georgian Height

Georgian Heights neighbors Holly Hill. The two are bounded together by Sullivant Avenue on the north, Demorest Road on the east, Clime Road on the south, and Georgesville Road on the west. Georgian Heights has a youth travel football team called the Georgian Heights Packers. The neighborhood is generally lower-middle class.

Riverbend

Riverbend is a neighborhood in southwest Columbus, Ohio. Riverbend started building around 1968 until the mid-1970s. It was a working-class neighborhood. Children played in the local creek and woods along with playing basketball, baseball and softball at Riverbend Park where the winning team would ride around the neighborhood honking their horns celebrating their win. There were two summer pools nearby, the Moose Lodge and Wee Bonnie (the latter now gone). A nine-hole golf course, also called Wee Bonnie, was adjacent to the pool and is also gone. The majority of students who live there attend Franklin Heights High School. Riverbend has been in decline due to the aging homes where now many are rented out, losing the sense of community.

Westgate

Westgate is a community within the Hilltop area of Columbus, Ohio. It was constructed partially on land formerly housing the American Civil War Camp Chase and Confederate prison. After the Civil War, the land was purchased by Joseph Binns and his associates to be used to start a Mennonite community. These plans failed to materialize and the land was developed as a "streetcar suburb" in the 1920s. The area near Westgate is home to the Hilltop branch of the Columbus Metropolitan Library, West High School, and Camp Chase Confederate Cemetery. About 4,500 residents live in 2,100 households within the Westgate boundaries. The boundaries are West Broad Street to the north, Roys Avenue to the east, Sullivant Avenue to the south, and Demorest Road to the west.

Wilshire Heights
Wilshire Heights is south of Westgate, with Sullivant Avenue as its north border, Harris Avenue to the east, Briggs Road to the south, Salisbury Road to the west. It is very similar to Westgate both culturally and in architecture.

Other areas
Other areas include Broad Lawn, Southwest Hilltop, Moneyback, Valleyview, and Valleyview Heights.

Westland

Lincoln Village

Just east of where New Rome used to be, this is the area north of West Broad Street from Doctors Hospital West to the Interstate 270 outerbelt. It is a census-designated place (CDP) in Prairie Township.

Murray Hill

Often included in Cherry Creek, Murray Hill is a street in a neighborhood on the West Side. It is part of the Lincoln Village subdivision and is colloquially known as Lincoln Village. It is bounded by West Broad Street on the north, Sullivant Avenue on the south, South Grener Avenue on the east, and Redmond and Hiler roads on the west.

Far West neighborhoods

Cherry Creek

Cherry Creek is a neighborhood on the West Side. It contains the Lincoln Park and Westview apartment complexes. It is bounded on the east by the Interstate 270 Outerbelt, on the north by Sullivant Avenue, on the west by Norton Road, and on the south by Hall Road.

Hardesty Heights
Hardesty Heights is located in the West Side, and the most western part of the neighborhood is also the city limits. Its eastern border is Norton Road and it is directly across from Cherry Creek. The neighborhood consists of townhouse-type condominiums, which all have carports. It is in Precinct 10 of the Columbus Police Department. They have their own security along with CPD Patrol.

Lincoln Village

Lincoln Village is a neighborhood located on the West Side of Columbus, Ohio and is known for its long history and historical impacts it has had on the surrounding communities. Most of the residential real estate is occupied by a mixture of owners and renters. Residents in this area tend to be older and well committed to this area. Homes were typically built between 1940 and 1969, while many others were built between 1970 and 1999. Those who built and live in these homes contain a unique mix of cultural or occupational groups.

Lincoln Village was founded in 1955 as a planned community by a real estate subsidiary of Nationwide Insurance. The community was developed to have all the essentials such as a shopping center, schools, and parks, and to incorporate safety considerations such as not positioning the homes on street corners to eliminate blind intersections.

Northside and Northwest

Northwest Columbus is a geographic region located in the northwest region of Franklin County, Ohio. The Northwest Civic Association, founded in 1967, acts as the commission of this area. It is bounded by the Scioto River on the west, the Olentangy River on the east, State Route 161 on the north, and Highland Drive and Henderson Road on the south. Northwest Columbus includes parts of Perry Township and Sharon Township, the City of Dublin, and the City of Worthington. Slightly more than 45,000 citizens live within this area according to the 2010 U.S. census.

The North Side

Brookhollow
This neighborhood is bounded by I-270 on the west, I-70 on the south, Trabue Rd. on the north, and Wilson Rd. on the east.

Flytown

Flytown was a neighborhood just northwest of downtown Columbus, encompassing portions of the present-day Arena District and western sections of the Victorian Village. In the 19th century, it was considered the center of the Irish-American community in the city after the arrival of immigrants fleeing the Great Famine, and Naughten Street, now Nationwide Boulevard, was nicknamed the "Irish Broadway." It is currently the location of the Thurbergate neighborhood, which has been incorporated into Harrison West.

Highland-McCoy

Highland-McCoy is less of a neighborhood than it is a rural-styled area in the midst of suburban development. It is considered the zone along Highland Drive, between Kendale and Knolls to the north, with Upper Arlington, Greenfield Estates and Thomas (not to be confused with Thomas Lane to the south).

Northcrest
Northcrest is a neighborhood on the northwest side of the city. It is bounded by Bethel Road on the north, Reed Road on the east, West Henderson Road on the south, and Woodrun Boulevard on the west.

Mill Run
This neighborhood is bounded by I-270 on the west, Cemetery and Hilliard Cemetery Rds. on the north, Smiley Rd. on the east, and Dinsmore Castle Rd. and the nearby railroad track on the south.

Linworth
Linworth is the historical name for the area in and around the intersection of State Route 161 and Linworth Road, bordered on the west by Brookside Estates and the OSU airport and on the east by State Route 315. The area received its name due to its location, between Dublin (dub-lin) and Worthington (worth-ington). The west part of Linworth is now in Columbus, and the east part (home to the Linworth Alternative Program school) is in Worthington.

Olentangy

Olentangy is a neighborhood that takes its name from the Olentangy River. Also called West Olentangy and Olentangy River Road, it is generally bordered by West North Broadway Street on the north, the Olentangy River on the east, West Lane Avenue on the south, and Upper Arlington on the west.

Olentangy Commons 

Olentangy Commons is a planned development residential area which is located in northwest Columbus, Ohio. The nearby areas surrounding the original 65-acre (263,045 square meters) site of the Olentangy Commons Apartments have been developed into commercial and residential neighborhoods.

Seagrave
This was a small area centered on the intersection of West Lane Avenue and Kenny Road on what is now the West Campus of the Ohio State University. Although much of the neighborhood was demolished to make way for State Route 315, a few buildings remain.

San Margherita

San Margherita is an unincorporated neighborhood that may be in danger of vanishing. Though most of the locally owned businesses in the neighborhood have been demolished to make way for widening roads and commercial development, the remaining houses in San Margherita still retain their original character. Most of the simple homes sit on an acre (4,000 m2) of land, giving it a somewhat rural feeling, and backyard vineyards planted by the original residents are still maintained today.

Harrison West

Harrison West is a historic, urban neighborhood located north and near west of downtown Columbus, Ohio. The neighborhood character is similar to the better-known Victorian Village just to the east. The area is bounded by Harrison Avenue on the east (which runs parallel to Neil Avenue), Goodale on the South, 5th Avenue on the North, and Olentangy River Road to the west (including "Gowdy Field"). In January 2008, the neighborhood expanded to include all of "Thurber Village" to the south east.

Developed from the Neil Farm in the early 20th century, Harrison West is characterized by Victorian and Edwardian-style homes, although the housing stock is generally more modest than the grand homes found in Victorian Village proper. Frame houses are more common than brick.

The Harrison West neighborhood area experienced urban decline throughout much of the late 20th century. Just south of Harrison West, the similar "Flytown" was destroyed during "slum clearance" in the 1960s and replaced by Interstate 670 and the "James Thurber Village" apartment and business area. Redevelopment and gentrification spreading from Victorian Village closer to downtown has transformed the area in the last two decades, accelerating with the demolition of industrial sites along the Olentangy River.

Today some of the homes have been split into rented apartments, while others remain as historical landmarks. Still others have since been purchased and restored to their original style. Numerous original houses of poor quality have been demolished and replaced with new construction in the same urban style. The Battelle Memorial Institute, a major employer, at one time owned numerous rental properties and, concerned about urban blight on its doorstep, became actively involved in area redevelopment in the 1980s.

Conversion of a  former factory site into a complex of single-family homes, flats and lofts is completing the improvement of the neighborhood into a desirable location. Life in the neighborhood centers on commercial properties along 3rd Avenue, which roughly bisects the neighborhood. Included in the development is a clubhouse that serves as the new home for the Carpe Diem String Quartet's performances.

The neighborhood was not originally intended as a separate district, but was constituted from the urban area excluded from the "Victorian Village Architectural Review" in 1974. A neighborhood association founded in 1976, like others in Columbus, advocates for city services and community projects. Current projects include water quality issues in the Olentangy River and maintenance of the Olentangy bike trail and the neighborhood parks, including a new river Park.

Fifth-by-Northwest
This neighborhood is just north of Grandview Heights. It is bordered by Kinnear Road on the north, the Olentangy River on the east, East Third Avenue on the south, and Wyandotte Road on the west.

University View
This neighborhood is part of the Tri-Village area, located just west of State Route 315 and the OSU campus. Nearly all the houses in this subdivision are of Cape Cod in style.

Olentangy River Road
Between the Olentangy Freeway/State Route 315 and the Olentangy River is a small neighborhood north of the Ohio State University campus. It is bordered by East North Broadway Street on the north and West Lane Avenue on the south. It is bisected by Olentangy River Road, Ackerman Road, and West Dodridge Street.

University District

Dennison Place/The Circles
Dennison Place is one of the neighborhoods that comprise the University District area of Columbus. It is located north of Victorian Village, south of NECKO and the Peach District, which collectively are considered to be the South Campus off-campus area of the Ohio State University. Its boundaries consist of King Avenue to the north, North High Street to the east, West Fifth Avenue to the south, and Perry Street to the west.

The land that Dennison Place now sits on was originally provided to Jonathan Dayton (US Representative, NJ, and namesake for Dayton, OH) in March 1800 by the United States Government. In 1802, Dayton sold the land to John Hunter and the land remained in this family until at least 1826. At this time, which was after John's passing, the Hunter family partitioned the land and there were several ownership changes until 1852. At this time, the land was conveyed to William and Anne Dennison by Anne's parents, Hannah and William Neil. As early as 1875, this area was now being referenced as Dennison Place and by the mid-1880s, development was in full force. Several of the previous owners' names still linger in the neighborhood as well in the streets such as Neil and Hunter avenues.

The area began to decline in the 1930s as Columbus expanded and people began to move away from the inner streetcar neighborhoods to the new suburbs accessible by car. By the time the decline bottomed out in the 1970s, many of the original homes had been converted to rooming houses, knocked down to make room for apartment buildings, or simply abandoned and boarded up.

Around this time, the city of Columbus began implementing neighborhood preservation policies and new zoning prevented further destruction of the neighborhood. By the 1980s, home restoration was ramping up and over a couple decades this process has led to the complete revitalization of the neighborhood to where it stands today.

The housing in Dennison Place remains mostly a mixture of Victorian-style construction from the late 1800s, including Queen Anne, Italianate and Grand Victorian homes. While some of these homes remain multi-family, Dennison Place has a high rate of owner occupancy that continues as families continue to move in and call Dennison their home. While there are a few apartment buildings around to remind people of a darker time for the neighborhood, the restoration of most of the homes to their former glory brings a traditional charm to Dennison.

Unlike the other Short North neighborhoods, Dennison Place does not have its own neighborhood commission. Instead, it is currently part of the University Area Commission, which also represents several other near-campus neighborhoods.

The neighborhood has a diverse group of residents and is home to a handful of small businesses, including an art gallery, a music education studio, two hair salons, eateries (including two separate taco trucks), a convenience store, an import beer carry-out, an auto repair shop, and several churches.

Glen Echo

Glen Echo is a neighborhood located in the far northern part of the University District in Columbus, Ohio. The name "Glen Echo" refers to the Glen Echo Ravine, which runs along the northern edge of the neighborhood.

Streets
Principal North/South streets in the eastern portion of the area are North Fourth Street, Glenmawr Avenue, Summit Street, Glen Echo Drive, and the bounding Indianola Avenue. East/West principal streets include Cliffside Drive, Arcadia Avenue, and the bounding Hudson Street.

North Fouth Street, Glenmawr Avenue, and Summmit Street each at an original 1900-1909 stone guardrail placed to prevent early drivers in the neighborhood from accidentally driving over the rim of the ravine at night.

The western portion of the neighborhood contains a disconnected section of the East/West Cliffside Drive, the north side of Arcadia Avenue, and one-block segments of Deming Avenue, Dayton Avenue, Hibbert Avenue, and Calumet Street. 

One additional street, Parkview Drive, was built in the ravine basin analogously to other nearby basin streets such as Overbrook Drive, Torrance Road, Walhalla Road, West Tulane Road, Iuka Avenue, and East 17th Avenue. Parkview Drive was the only fully internal road in the neighborhood to directly connect the Eastern and Western sections of the neighborhood straight through across Indianola Avenue. Cliffside Drive does not cross Indianola Avenue, and while Arcadia Avenue does, it is the southern bounding street in the western portion of the neighborhood and not internal there.

Parkview Drive originated at the northern end of North Fourth Street, and the route down the ravine wall into the basin is lined with another original pre-1909 stone guardrail. The ravine floor itself surrounding this road between Fourth Street and Indianola Avenue consisted of a public park, while a pair of spur routes climbed out of the ravine on the North side of Glen Echo Run to connect to land plots south of an old rail spur that followed the northern edge of the modern ravine park. These spur routes are largely dirt hiking trails today. An additional spur route connected to an alley running behind houses sandwiched between the north side of the ravine and the rail spur. The street featured an underpass beneath Indianola Avenue, which today is the local landmark known as the Bird Tunnel. The remaining segment of the street followed a mostly narrow ravine floor surrounded by private residences on both sides. 

Of Parkview Drive and its surroundings, a 1909 Ohio State publication described the new north side park as a place of beauty where large oak and elm trees shaded a wading pond, five small lakes connected by a single stream, rustic benches, foot bridges and springs lined with cobblestones. Glen Echo's picturesque environs hosted picnic dinners, equestrians and motorists who enjoyed this oasis of greenery.

While the route was and is sufficiently picturesque that this park is still in heavy use today, there were problems with the route’s suitability for street carriage. The rail spur connected to a factory for the production of ceramic and stone sewer pipes which stood on the present-day site of Dominion Middle School. The rail spur substantially predated the street, and was connected across the ravine by building a landfill bridge using the backfill collected during the grading of the route. Because of this solid land bridge, the street could not be completed along the remaining length of the ravine to High Street like the other ravine basin roads without undertaking the massive expense and disruption of closing the rail spur to remove all of the landfill and reconstruct the rail spur as a proper spanning bridge, and instead had to curve back to meet Arcadia Avenue at the eastern edge of the factory grounds (today’s Dominion Middle School grounds). This segment of the street still exists today as a portion of Calumet Street. Partially because of this issue, unlike the aforementioned ravine basin streets which persist on Columbus’s street grid today, Parkview Drive did not come to its terminus by climbing uphill along a final broadly landfilled section of the ravine, instead climbing up the sheer and relatively loose cliff face of soil and shale on the southern side of the ravine as it approached the pipe factory.

The Calumet Street bridge over the ravine was built in the mid-1920s around the same time as North High School (today’s Dominion Middle School), and formed a 4-way intersection between the bridge, the old segment of Parkview Drive which had been reappropriated as a connecting segment of Calumet Street, and Cliffside Drive which followed along the south rim of the ravine. During this time, the rail spur was removed in order to regrade the land adjacent to the South abutment of the Calumet Street bridge to make the land contours smoother for drivers taking this route. The landfill bridge that carried the rail spur was not removed and today exists as a footbridge connecting to the back grounds of a religious school on the north rim of the Ravine. 

Sometime before 1953, likely due to worsening erosion as the loose cliff face naturally receded, the section of Parkview Drive from the Indianola Avenue underpass to the endpoint at Calumet Street was permanently closed and completely abandoned. Stray old brick pavers, loose and degraded gravel, and fragmentary remains of some infrastructure associated with the street segment can still be seen today, and a significant portion of the abandoned section of the original route is still accessible by walking along Glen Echo run along the higher and usually dry sections of the present streambed and portions of the neighboring ravine basin floor. Some additional evidence of the street can be seen in the form of decades-old debris thrown by drivers into the ravine.

In 1975, on the recommendation of a watercourse planning report, the remaining segment of Parkview Drive connecting between 4th Street and the Indianola Avenue underpass was permanently closed and converted into the main trail for the park lining the ravine. Due to this closure, a final connecting spur which attached Parkview Drive to the north end of Glen Echo Drive along another minor ravine via an underpass beneath Arcadia Avenue was also closed. Unlike the main route of the street, this spur route was not maintained as part of the park’s infrastructure, and while still open to parkgoers, today it is in a state of severe disrepair with badly disintegrated pavement and numerous large holes in the street.

Today, this spur route, some of the easternmost dirt trails along the north side of the ravine, the Bird Tunnel, and the main path through Glen Echo Park are all that remains of Parkview Drive.

Homes
Most of the homes in the Glen Echo neighborhood were built between 1909 and 1943 and include Craftsman-style bungalows, Shingle Style, Tudor Revival and Colonial Revival, many with front and/or sleeping porches. Most homes, however, are not "high-style" structures and would be classified as either traditional American Four-Square or American vernacular in style. The homes are a mix of single and double units with a high home-owner occupancy rate. Grassy boulevards are features of Glenmawr Avenue and North Fourth Street. These elliptical islands are classified as parks with the Columbus Department of Recreation and Parks. Stone stanchions and street furniture are a hallmark of Glenmawr Avenue. The 1997 listing of the neighborhood on the National Register of Historic Places was made based on the neighborhood's overall fabric as a middle-class development, rather than as a collection of high-style architecture.

Other Features
A small plastic jar factory exists at the extreme southeast corner of the eastern neighborhood. 

A concentration of 5 apartment buildings exists at the southeast corner of Arcadia Avenue and Indianola Avenue, near the middle-west edge of the eastern neighborhood. An additional 2 apartment buildings exist at the southwest corner of Cliffside Drive and Indianola Avenue

A currently vacant commercial building exists at the northwest corner of Cliffside Drive and Indianola Avenue.

Glen Echo United Presbyterian Church occupies the corner where Parkview Drive used to meet Cliffside Drive and Calumet Street across from Dominion Middle School. 

The need to avoid passing through this neighborhood along with conflicting local streetcar traffic south of Arcadia Avenue on High Street led to the need to route an interurban streetcar route via a series of turns that shifted traffic first to Indianola Avenue and then to Summit Street on their way to the interurban terminal at the present site of the Columbus Commons. These interurban streetcars were the length of a large bus or small semi truck, and tracked the rails near each end with no articulation. Because of this, a series of street corners, namely those at the northeast corner of Arcadia Avenue and High Street, at the southwest corner of Arcadia Avenue and Indianola Avenue, at the northeast corner of Hudson Street and Indianola avenue, and at the southwest corner of Hudson Street and Summit Street were all rounded back significantly compared to other street corners in Columbus in order to accommodate the swing of these large vehicles. These swept corner curbs still exist today, giving the major intersections near this neighborhood an oddly unbalanced or less-than-straight appearance.

Indianola Forest

This neighborhood is part of the University District. It is one of the smaller neighborhoods in the University District and is referred to as being part of either the larger East-of-High or North Campus off-campus residential districts of the Ohio State University as it sits northeast of the Main Academic Campus of OSU. Indianola Forest's boundaries are Lane Avenue to the north, East 18th Street Avenue to the south, North High Street to the west and Indianola Avenue to the east.

Indianola Terrace
This neighborhood is part of the University District. It is referred to as being part of the larger East-of-High off-campus residential district of the Ohio State University as it sits east of the Main Academic Campus of OSU.

Iuka Ravine
This area is part of the University District and is referred to as being part of the larger East-of-High off-campus residential district of the Ohio State University as it sits east of the Main Academic Campus of OSU. Iuka Ravine's boundaries are Northwood and Lane Avenues to the north, Woodruff Avenue and East 20th Street to the south, North 4th Street to the east and Indianola Avenue to the west.

NECKO
The NECKO neighborhood is a small neighborhood bounded by Neil Avenue, West Eighth Avenue, Cannon Drive, and King Avenue. Part of the historic E.J. McMillen Homestead Addition, NECKO is located between the Ohio State University Medical Center and Battelle Memorial Institute. Predominately a residential neighborhood, the variety of homes in NECKO ranges from elaborate, prestigious homes to simpler, classic motifs and grew out of the diversity of income levels of residents and changes in building styles over four decades of construction. Now part of the Near North Side Historic District, NECKO is recognized as significant for its eclectic architectural styling and unique neighborhood layout.

Northwood Park

The Northwood & Oakland Avenue area (sometimes referred to as Northwood Park) is located in the northern University Area and is bounded by Patterson Avenue to the north and Northwood Avenue to the south and Pearl Alley to the west and Indianola Avenue to the east. It is sometimes considered to go as far north as Blake Avenue.

The homes are traditionally American foursquare with some classical, prairie, colonial, and Craftsman mixed in to create a tree-lined neighborhood. The neighborhood is known for its strong sense of community, large homes, gardens and brick alleys. It also has a very high percentage of owner occupancy. Northwood Park has been designated as a historical district.

Old North Columbus

Old North Columbus commonly refers to the area north of Lane Avenue to Slate run in Glen Echo Ravine, extending east to Silver Drive and west to Olentangy River Road, including the Union Cemetery in the University District. The area includes several smaller neighborhoods within these general boundaries, including the Iuka Ravine, Indianola Forest, Oakland & Northwood Ave, and Glen Echo. In October 2009, the City of Columbus officially recognized the neighborhood by installing two "Old North Columbus" arches along N. High Street – one at Lane Avenue and the second at Arcadia Avenue. Both arches were requested by Old North Columbus residents, through the Olde North Columbus Preservation Society and the Findley Avenue Community Watch Collaborative.

The University Area Commission's Community Relation's Committee voted on August 5, 2009 to recognize Old North Columbus as a University District neighborhood within the commission's boundaries.

Peach District
Peach District is a recently created neighborhood located in the University District. It was named the Peach District by a group of local residents seeking an identity for their previously unnamed neighborhood. As it is a recently created neighborhood, its boundaries are fairly firm, but still evolving. It is typically bounded by Eleventh Avenue to the north, King Avenue to the south, North High Street to the east and Neil Avenue to the west, although other boundaries have included Ninth Avenue to the north and Fifth Avenue to the south, with the district overlapping Dennison Place/The Circles.

SoHud
SoHud is an emerging neighborhood located in the University District. It is a portmanteau of the words South and Hudson as the district lies South of Hudson. It is bounded by Hudson Street to the north, Northwood and Lane Avenues to the south, Indianola Avenue to the west and the Big Four railroad tracks to the east.

Tuttle Park
Tuttle Park is a neighborhood located in the University District. It is generally referred to as being part of the larger North Campus off-campus housing of the Ohio State University as it lies directly north of the North Campus of Main Academic Campus of OSU. It is bounded by Iuka Ravine to the north, Lane Avenue to the south, North High Street to the east and the Olentangy River to the west.

Weinland Park
On the near north side of the city in the University Area, this neighborhood is bordered by Chittenden Avenue on the north, the Big Four Railroad on the east, Italian Village on the south, and North High Street on the west. The neighborhood is currently the focus of planning efforts, including the Weinland Park Neighborhood Plan adopted by Columbus City Council in 2006. The plan has initiated revitalization of the area as evidenced by recently renovated apartments and plans to turn the old factories and businesses into housing, a farmers market, a restaurant, and a food-processing center.

Northeast

Argyle Park

Argyle Park is an area near North Central bounded by East Hudson Street on the north, Woodland Avenue on the east, East 17th and East 26th avenues on the south, and Billiter Boulevard on the west.

Brittany Hills
Brittany Hills is a neighborhood on the central-northeast side. Developed about 40 years ago, it is bounded on the north by Mock Road, on the east by Sunbury Road and Alum Creek, on the south by Bethesda Avenue, and on the west by Brentnell Avenue.

Shepard
The neighborhood of Shepard is located near the intersection of East Fifth Avenue and Nelson Road. Located there is a Columbus Metropolitan Library. It is encompassed by Rt. 670 along its east and south edges. To the north is Ohio Dominican College and to the West is a railroad track.

Milo-Grogan

This area is bordered by the CSX right-of-way south of 1st Avenue and I-670 to the south, the CSX right-of-way west of Penny Street to the west, 11th Avenue and the CSX right-of-way north of Camden Avenue to the north, and the CSX right-of-way east of Kessler Street to the east.

Linden

Linden is a neighborhood in the northeast part of Columbus, Ohio. It extends south to north from Eighth Avenue to E. Cooke and Ferris roads and west to east from Conrail tracks to Joyce Avenue/Westerville Road. The neighborhood is officially bounded on the south, west and east by Conrail-operated railroads. Hudson Street divides the neighborhood into North and South Linden. The neighborhood has a total land area of almost 15 km2.

Other areas
Other areas include Amercrest/American Addition, Brentnell Park, Bridgeview, Devon Triangle, Gateway, Framingham, St. Marys, Teakwood, and Walnut Creek.

Glenbrook
Forming a triangular-shaped area on the southeast side, the Glenbrook neighborhood is bordered by Interstate 70 on the north, Courtright Road on the east, and U.S. Route 33 on the south and west.

Berwick

Berwick is bordered by East Livingston Avenue to the north, Alum Creek to the west, Interstate 70 to the south, and South James Road to the east. It is an upper/middle-class neighborhood made up of a diverse racial and religious population on the East Side just south of the suburb of Bexley. It has long been called the area of Columbus' Black Elite, as well as having a large Jewish population.

Berwyn East (Berwick Manor)
Berwyn East or Berwick Manor is bordered by East Livingston Avenue to the north, South James Road to the west, Interstate 70 to the south, and the abandoned railroad line that lies just east of Bostwick Road to the east. The entire area lies within the 43227 zip code. It is a predominately African-American area commercially centered on East Livingston Avenue. Berywn East is a relatively new neighborhood designation, as "Berwyn East" contains several subdivisions within that have longtime recognized names such as Scottwood, Liv-Moor Heights, Berwick Manor. Bishop Hartley High School, Columbus' only co-ed Catholic High School on the East side is located within Berwyn East.

Far East neighborhoods
The Far East side is a conglomerate of numerous single and multiple family residential subdivisions gathered together as a whole and is centered on Big Walnut Park and Big Walnut Creek, and to the north, Whitehall, to the east, Reynoldsburg, to the south, Interstate 70 and Eastland, and to the west, eastoor. The area is populated with many schools in close proximity, including three elementary schools, a middle school, and high school, all within one mile of each other.

Eastland
The Eastland area is centered on the Eastland Mall, located just south of Interstate 70. The Interstate 270 outerbelt splits right through the area.

Taylor Station

Eastmoor
Eastmoor is a postwar enclave built about 2 miles south of Port Columbus and just west of the massive Defense Supply Center, Columbus complex. On the East Side, Eastmoor is bounded by Ruhl Avenue on the north, James Road to the east, East Livingston Avenue on the south, and South Gould and Kenwick roads on the west. The neighborhood east of James Road is Mayfair, which is often confused with Eastmoor. Eastmoor south of East Main Street is referred to as Eastmoor South. Eastminster is a subsection of Eastmoor South. Boundaries for Eastminster are Brownlee Avenue to the north, James Road to the east, East Livingston Avenue to the south, Kenwick Road to the west. The northern part of Eastmoor, north of Broad St. is called North Eastmoor.

Easton area
The Easton area is centered on the Easton Town Center. It is a destination for local business and for entertainment. Roads and highways in the area include Interstate 270, Easton Way, Morse and Stelzer roads.

Mayfair
Mayfair is the neighborhood east of James Road between East Main and Broad streets and Whitehall. It is often confused with Eastmoor.

Far North/Northland
The Far North is a neighborhood north of the Interstate 270 outerbelt. It is bordered by East Powell Road on the north, North Cleveland Avenue and Interstate 71 on the east, I-270 on the south, and the west border of the Highbanks Metro Park on the west.

Northland
The Northland area has about 25 square miles, and includes several smaller neighborhoods, including Clinton Estates, Forest Park, Maize-Morse, Minerva Park, Northern Woods, and Woodward Park. Northland is bordered mostly by the Interstate 270 outerbelt and East Dublin-Granville Road/State Route 161 on the north (some areas go as north as the Hoover Reservoir), New Albany on the east, Morse and East Cooke roads on the south, and Sinclair Road and Busch Boulevard on the west. The neighborhood got its name from the Northland Mall.

Sharon Woods
Just north of Forest Park, this neighborhood is bordered by Interstate 270 on the north, the Northern Woods neighborhood on the east, and Karl Road on the west.

Other areas

South end 

The Far South is a neighborhood bordered just north of Frank Road/State Route 104 on the north, Alum Creek on the east, Interstate 270 outerbelt/city limits on the south, and the Scioto River on the west.

McKinley Avenue Corridor
The McKinley Avenue Corridor in a neighborhood bounded by Trabue Road on the north, Dublin Road/U.S. Route 33 on the northeast, State Route 315 on the west, McKinley Avenue and Interstate 70 on the south, and North Hague Avenue on the west.

South Side
The South Side (also spelled Southside) is a neighborhood bounded by Interstate 70 on the north and east, Frebis Avenue on the south, and Parsons Avenue on the west.

North Central
This area is bordered by East Hudson Street and Mock Road on the north; Alum Creek on the east; the Conrail tracks and Interstate 670 on the south; and the Conrail tracks and East 17th, Joyce, and East 25th avenues on the west.

Northeast
The Northeast is bordered by Morse Road on the north, the Interstate 270 outerbelt on the east, Interstate 670 and Mock Road on the south, and Sunbury and Westerville roads on the west.

South Alum Creek
South Alum Creek is a neighborhood in the southeast part of the city. It is bounded by Refugee Road on the north, U.S. Route 33/State Route 317 on the northeast, the Interstate 270 southwest, and the railroad tracks on the west.

Westland
The Westland area is bounded by West Broad Street/U.S. Route 40 on the north, the Interstate 270 outerbelt on the east, Big Run Road on the southwest, and Galloway on the west.

Ghost neighborhoods

There are some ghost towns and neighborhoods in Columbus.

Wonderland
Wonderland is a ghost town along Hamilton Road, at I-270. Currently owned by John Glenn Columbus International (CMH) Airport. Much of the neighborhood was demolished in the building of I-270, the rest was razed by the Airport in expansions. Currently there are two properties not owned by CMH, Wonderland Community Church and Atlas Construction Co Inc.

Wood-Brown
Wood-Brown is a historic ghost neighborhood of Columbus, Ohio. Existing prior to 1872, the neighborhood is situated in what was then southern Clinton Township, at Lisle Avenue (Kenny Road) and Lane Avenue. Today, it is mainly overrun by warehouses, with a few buildings older than 1962 still existing. It may have also been called Lanevue, or Seagrave, after Frederick Seagrave moved his firefighting equipment manufacturing from Detroit to Columbus in 1891.

Hanford Village
Hanford Village was an African-American neighborhood of Columbus, Ohio. Founded in the early 1900s, the neighborhood was open to African-American soldiers returning from World War II. In the 1960s the neighborhood was demolished to make room for Interstate 71. The neighborhood was located between the railroad and Alum Creek, south of Main Street and north of Livingston Avenue. A few streets and original post-war houses still exist, but they are separated physically by the interstate exit and are no longer a recognized neighborhood.

See also
 Columbus Neighborhoods, a WOSU television show

References

Notes

Resources
City of Columbus Neighborhood Plans
Datasource Columbus

 
Columbus